Grüner was an "Alpine" restaurant in Portland, Oregon.

Description and history
The restaurant was opened by Chris Israel in late 2009, and closed after December 31, 2015. Grüner's mainstay burger (dubbed "The Hambürger") was thought by many to be Portland's best, and it was reintroduced at The Loyal Legion when the former Executive Chef of Grüner took over that venue's bar. The restaurant also served bratwurst, pretzel-wrapped weisswurst, saucisson sausage, sauerkraut, gold potatoes, and sweet-hot mustard. The drink menu included German-style beers.

Kask
Grüner's attached bar, Kask, was named one of the top five cocktail bars in the city by the Drink Spirits magazine, and remains open. Kask was given a four star rating by the Difford's Guide in 2014.

See also

 List of defunct restaurants of the United States
 List of German restaurants

References

External links
 Gruner at Zomato

2009 establishments in Oregon
2015 disestablishments in Oregon
Austrian cuisine
Defunct European restaurants in Portland, Oregon
Defunct German restaurants in the United States
German restaurants in Portland, Oregon
Restaurants disestablished in 2015
Restaurants established in 2009
Southwest Portland, Oregon
Swiss-American cuisine